The 2017 Nova Scotia general election was held on May 30, 2017, to elect members to the Nova Scotia House of Assembly.

The Liberals under Premier Stephen McNeil won re-election with a somewhat reduced majority, falling from 34 seats at dissolution to 27 seats.

Timeline
 October 8, 2013 – The Liberal Party, led by Stephen McNeil, wins the 2013 Nova Scotia general election. The Progressive Conservative Association becomes the official opposition, and the governing New Democratic Party is relegated to third party status.
 November 23, 2013 – Darrell Dexter resigns as leader of the New Democratic Party (NDP) and MLA Maureen MacDonald becomes interim leader.
February 27, 2016 – Gary Burrill is elected leader of the Nova Scotia New Democratic Party.
June 28, 2016 - The Atlantica Party becomes Nova Scotia's newest registered political party.
April 30, 2017 – Premier Stephen McNeil calls a general election for May 30, 2017.

Party standings

Results by party

Retiring incumbents

Liberal
Diana Whalen, Clayton Park West

New Democratic
Sterling Belliveau, Queens-Shelburne
Marian Mancini, Dartmouth South

Independent
Andrew Younger, Dartmouth East

Nominated candidates

Annapolis Valley

|-
|bgcolor=whitesmoke|Annapolis
||
|Stephen McNeil6,41064.73%
|
|Ginny Hurlock1,48014.94%
|
|Colin Sproul1,51715.32%

|
|Zac Crockatt3663.70%
|
|Kent Robinson1301.31%
||
|Stephen McNeil
|-
|bgcolor=whitesmoke|Clare-Digby
||
|Gordon Wilson4,04450.49%
|
|Normand Cormier2,28328.51%
|
| Harold Neil1,68221.00%
|
|
|
|
||
|Gordon Wilson
|-
|bgcolor=whitesmoke|Hants West
||
|Chuck Porter4,58954.87%
|
|Janice Munroe Dodge2,41628.89%
|
|Lalia Kerr1,04212.46%
|
|Torin Buzek2432.91%
|
|Edward Boucher730.87%
||
|Chuck Porter
|-
|bgcolor=whitesmoke|Kings North
|
|Geof Turner2,78433.46%
||
|John Lohr3,82345.94%
|
|Ted Champion1,34716.19%
|
|Mary Lou Harley2953.55%
|
|Bryden Deadder720.87%
||
|John Lohr
|-
|bgcolor=whitesmoke|Kings South
||
|Keith Irving4,26946.71%
|
|Peter Harrison2,49627.31%
|
|Stephen Schneider1,92121.02%
|
|Sheila Richardson3373.69%
|
|Joel Hirtle1161.27%
||
|Keith Irving
|-
|bgcolor=whitesmoke|Kings West
||
|Leo Glavine4,19052.45%
|
|Chris Palmer3,01537.74%
|
|Cheryl Burbidge5366.71%
|
|Madeline Taylor2473.09%
|
|
||
|Leo Glavine
|}

South Shore

|-
|bgcolor=whitesmoke|Argyle-Barrington
|
|Louis d'Entremont1,84129.72%
||
|Chris d'Entremont4,03165.07%
|
|Greg Foster3235.21%
|
|
||
|Chris d'Entremont
|-
|bgcolor=whitesmoke|Chester-St. Margaret's
||
|Hugh MacKay3,11235.46%
|
|Julie Chaisson2,23025.41%
|
|Denise Peterson-Rafuse3,02134.42%
|
|Harry Ward4134.71%
||
|Denise Peterson-Rafuse
|-
|bgcolor=whitesmoke|Lunenburg
||
|Suzanne Lohnes-Croft3,11039.45%
|
|Brian Pickings 2,43730.91%
|
|Marc Breaugh2,33629.63%
|
|
||
|Suzanne Lohnes-Croft
|-
|bgcolor=whitesmoke|Lunenburg West
||
|Mark Furey3,83947.10%
|
|Carole Hipwell2,26127.74%
|
|Lisa Norman1,69020.73%
|
|Michael Sheppard3614.43%
||
|Mark Furey
|-
|bgcolor=whitesmoke|Queens-Shelburne
|
|Vernon Oickle2,30331.11%
||
|Kim Masland3,24443.82%
|
|John Davis1,58121.36%
|
|Kathaleen Milan2753.71%
||
|Sterling Belliveau†
|-
|bgcolor=whitesmoke|Yarmouth
||
|Zach Churchill5,36468.16%
|
|Mitch Bonnar2,00725.50%
|
|David Olie2433.09%
|
|Jim Laverie2563.25%
||
|Zach Churchill
|}

Fundy-Northeast

|-
|bgcolor=whitesmoke|Colchester-Musquodoboit Valley
|
|Matthew Rushton1,94726.94%
||
|Larry Harrison3,65550.57%
|
|Janet Moulton1,62522.49%
|
|
|
|
|
|
||
|Larry Harrison
|-
|bgcolor=whitesmoke|Colchester North
||
|Karen Casey3,65446.49%
|
|Rebecca Taylor3,22541.04%
|
|James Finnie98012.47%
|
|
|
|
|
|
||
|Karen Casey
|-
|bgcolor=whitesmoke|Cumberland North
|
|Terry Farrell2,71338.59%
||
|Elizabeth Smith-McCrossin3,63251.66%
|
|Earl Dow4967.05%
|
|
|
|Bill Archer841.19%
|
|Richard Plett 1061.51%
||
|Terry Farrell
|-
|bgcolor=whitesmoke|Cumberland South
|
|Kenny John Jackson2,77940.47%
||
|Jamie Baillie 3,53651.49%
|
|Larry Duchesne3985.80%
|
|
|
|Thor Lengies 1542.24%
|
|
||
|Jamie Baillie
|-
|bgcolor=whitesmoke|Hants East
||
|Margaret Miller3,92343.67%
|
|John A. MacDonald3,10434.55%
|
|Liam Crouse1,50816.79%
|
|Jenn Kang4495.00%
|
|
|
|
||
|Margaret Miller
|-
|bgcolor=whitesmoke|Truro-Bible Hill-Millbrook-Salmon River
|
|Craig Johnson1,89424.09%
|
|Keltie Jones2,51231.96%
||
|Lenore Zann3,45543.95%
|
|
|
|
|
|
||
|Lenore Zann
|}

Central Halifax

|-
|bgcolor=whitesmoke|Clayton Park West
||
|Rafah DiCostanzo4,03546.05%
|
|Paul Kimball2,30426.29%
|
|Rana Zaman1,76420.13%
|
|Thomas Trappenberg5065.77%
|
|Jonathan Dean1541.76%
||
|Diana Whalen†
|-
|bgcolor=whitesmoke|Fairview-Clayton Park
||
|Patricia Arab2,92539.90%
|
|Paul Beasant1,83925.09%
|
|Joanne Hussey2,19029.88%
|
|Charlene Boyce3765.13%
|
|
||
|Patricia Arab
|-
|bgcolor=whitesmoke|Halifax Armdale
||
|Lena Diab2,96244.58%
|
|Sylvia Gillard1,25318.86%
|
|David Wheeler2,09831.58%
|
|Marc-André Tremblay2463.70%
|
|Michael McLeod851.28%
||
|Lena Diab
|-
|bgcolor=whitesmoke|Halifax Chebucto
|
|Joachim Stroink3,57339.29%
|
|John Wesley Chisholm96310.59%
||
|Gary Burrill4,19746.15%
|
|Casey Meijer3613.97%
|
|
||
|Joachim Stroink
|-
|bgcolor=whitesmoke|Halifax Citadel-Sable Island
||
|Labi Kousoulis2,41941.28%
|
|Rob Batherson1,48025.26%
|
|Glenn Walton 1,61827.61%
|
|Martin Willison3435.85%
|
|
||
|Labi Kousoulis
|-
|bgcolor=whitesmoke|Halifax Needham
|
|Melinda Daye2,07527.47%
|
|Matthew Donahoe1,13515.02%
||
|Lisa Roberts3,88051.36%
|
|Andrew Jamieson4656.15%
|
|
||
|Lisa Roberts
|}

Suburban Halifax

|-
|bgcolor=whitesmoke|Bedford
||
|Kelly Regan5,83152.69%
|
|Valerie White3,38830.62%
|
|Blake Wright1,36212.31%
|
|Michealle Hanshaw4854.38%
|
|
||
|Kelly Regan
|-
|bgcolor=whitesmoke|Halifax Atlantic
||
|Brendan Maguire4,21955.48%
|
|Bruce Holland1,30017.10%
|
|Trish Keeping1,72822.72%
|
|Chelsey Carter3574.69%
|
|
||
|Brendan Maguire
|-
|bgcolor=whitesmoke|Hammonds Plains-Lucasville
||
|Ben Jessome3,43246.69%
|
|Matt Whitman2,42132.94%
|
|Paul McGuinness1,15715.74%
|
|Jessica Alexander3404.63%
|
|
||
|Ben Jessome
|-
|bgcolor=whitesmoke|Sackville-Beaver Bank
|
|Stephen Gough2,15532.13%
||
|Brad Johns2,92343.58%
|
|Dennis Kutchera1,33219.86%
|
|Michael Montgomery2313.44%
|
|Rita Billington660.98%
||
|Stephen Gough
|-
|bgcolor=whitesmoke|Sackville-Cobequid
|
|Michel Hindlet2,03825.98%
|
|John Giannakos1,99125.38%
||
|Dave Wilson3,46544.17%
|
|Tanner Montgomery2623.34%
|
|Cathy Morgan881.12%
||
|Dave Wilson
|-
|bgcolor=whitesmoke|Timberlea-Prospect
||
|Iain Rankin4,27249.90%
|
|Tim Kohoot2,03023.71%
|
|Linda Moxsom Skinner1,80421.07%
|
|Kai Trappenberg3373.94%
|
|Matt Mansfield1181.38%
||
|Iain Rankin
|-
|bgcolor=whitesmoke|Waverley-Fall River-Beaver Bank
||
|Bill Horne3,16037.94%
|
|Dan McNaughton3,09537.16%
|
|Trevor Sanipass1,56718.82%
| 
|Anthony Edmonds5066.08%
|
|
||
|Bill Horne
|}

Dartmouth/Cole Harbour/Eastern Shore

|-
|bgcolor=whitesmoke|Cole Harbour-Eastern Passage
|
|Joyce Treen2,58535.08%
||
|Barbara Adams2,68236.40%
|
|Nancy Jakeman1,75923.87%
|
|Rebecca Mosher3434.65%
|
|
|
|
||
|Joyce Treen
|-
|bgcolor=whitesmoke|Cole Harbour-Portland Valley
||
|Tony Ince3,58336.85%
|
|Chris Mont3,20332.94%
|
|Andre Cain2,55226.25%
|
|Melanie Mulrooney3853.96%
|
|
|
|
||
|Tony Ince
|-
|bgcolor=whitesmoke|Dartmouth East
|
|Edgar Burns3,11838.78%
||
|Tim Halman3,30941.15%
|
|Bill McEwen96411.99%
|
|Matthew Richey6508.08%
|
|
|
|
||
|Andrew Younger†
|-
|bgcolor=whitesmoke| Dartmouth North
|
|Joanne Bernard2,44234.68%
|
|Melanie Russell1,38419.66%
||
|Susan Leblanc2,77139.36%
|
|Tyler Colbourne3184.52%
|
|David Boyd1261.79%
|
|
||
|Joanne Bernard
|-
|bgcolor=whitesmoke|Dartmouth South
|
|Vishal Bhardwaj3,34837.45%
|
|Jad Crnogorac1,41815.86%
||
|Claudia Chender3,54539.65%
|
|June Trenholm5065.66%
|
|Jim Murray 1231.38%
|
|
|
|Vacant†
|-
|bgcolor=whitesmoke|Eastern Shore
||
|Kevin Murphy2,52737.71%
|
|Patricia Auchnie2,02430.20%
|
|Devin Ashley1,78026.56%
|
|Andy Berry2213.30%
|
|
|
|Randy Carter1492.22%
||
|Kevin Murphy
|-
|bgcolor=whitesmoke|Preston-Dartmouth
||
|Keith Colwell2,57251.33%
|
|Irvine Carvery1,10522.05%
|
|Shelley Fashan1,11322.21%
|
|Aaron Alexander2214.41%
|
|
|
|
||
|Keith Colwell
|}

Central Nova

|-
|bgcolor=whitesmoke|Antigonish
||
|Randy Delorey3,87743.38%
|
|Ray Mattie3,13935.12%
|
|Moraig MacGillivray1,81520.31%
|
|
|
|Ryan Smyth 1061.19%
||
|Randy Delorey
|-
|bgcolor=whitesmoke|Guysborough–Eastern Shore–Tracadie
||
|Lloyd Hines2,56543.09%
|
|Rob Wolf2,49441.89%
|
|Marney Simmons89415.02%
|
|
|
|
||
|Lloyd Hines
|-
|bgcolor=whitesmoke|Pictou Centre
|
|Jeff Davis2,02728.13%
||
|Pat Dunn3,77352.36%
|
|Henderson Paris1,40619.51%
|
|
|
|
||
|Pat Dunn
|-
|bgcolor=whitesmoke|Pictou East
|
|John Fraser1,30118.22%
||
|Tim Houston5,27573.88%
|
|Deborah Stiles5647.90%
|
|
|
|
||
|Tim Houston
|-
|bgcolor=whitesmoke|Pictou West
|
|Ben MacLean1,14316.47%
||
|Karla MacFarlane4,33362.44%
|
|Shawn McNamara1,30218.76%
|
|Cecile Vigneault1612.32%
|
|
||
|Karla MacFarlane
|}

Cape Breton

|-
|bgcolor=whitesmoke|Cape Breton Centre
|
|David Wilton2,62333.58%
|
|Louie Piovesan1,77022.66%
||
|Tammy Martin3,41943.77%
|
|
|
|
|
|
||
|David Wilton
|-
|bgcolor=whitesmoke|Cape Breton-Richmond
|
|Michel Samson3,31643.30%
||
|Alana Paon3,33743.57%
|
|Larry Keating1,00613.13%
|
|
|
|
|
|
||
|Michel Samson
|-
|bgcolor=whitesmoke|Glace Bay
||
|Geoff MacLellan3,31746.65%
|
|John White2,93841.32%
|
|Lois MacDougall71810.10%
|
|
|
|Steven MacNeil1371.93%
|
|
||
|Geoff MacLellan
|-
|bgcolor=whitesmoke|Inverness
|
|Bobby Morris2,34731.00%
||
|Allan MacMaster4,68761.90%
|
|Michelle Smith 5387.11%
|
|
|
|
|
|
||
|Allan MacMaster
|-
|bgcolor=whitesmoke|Northside-Westmount
|
|John Higgins1,98521.20%
||
|Eddie Orrell5,94163.46%
|
|Ronald Crowther1,43615.34%
|
|
|
|
|
|
||
|Eddie Orrell
|-
|bgcolor=whitesmoke|Sydney River-Mira-Louisbourg
|
|Katherine MacDonald2,22123.62%
||
|Alfie MacLeod6,37067.73%
|
|Bill Matheson8148.65%
|
|
|
|
|
|
||
|Alfie MacLeod
|-
|bgcolor=whitesmoke|Sydney-Whitney Pier
||
|Derek Mombourquette3,65638.72%
|
|Laurie MacIntosh2,29024.25%
|
|Madonna Doucette3,49637.03%
|
|
|
|
|
|
||
|Derek Mombourquette
|-
|bgcolor=whitesmoke|Victoria-The Lakes
|
|Pam Eyking1,96926.81%
||
|Keith Bain4,37359.55%
|
|Lisa Bond5447.41%
|
|Adrianna MacKinnon2653.61%
|
|
|
|Stemer MacLeod1922.61%
||
|Pam Eyking
|}

Opinion polls

References

2017 elections in Canada
2017 in Nova Scotia
2017
May 2017 events in Canada